Fages may refer to:

Pedro Fages  (1734–1794), Spanish soldier and explorer
Pascal Fages, French rugby player
Carles Fages de Climent (1902–1968) Spanish writer, poet and journalist

See also
Fage (disambiguation)
Phage (disambiguation)